Pau is a comune (municipality) in the Province of Oristano in the Italian region Sardinia, located about  northwest of Cagliari and about  southeast of Oristano.

Pau borders the following municipalities: Ales, Palmas Arborea, Santa Giusta, Villa Verde.

Demographic evolution

References

External links

 www.comunepau.it

Cities and towns in Sardinia